Bennett Leonard Lewis  (born 18 June 1926) is a retired lieutenant general in the United States Army who served as Deputy Assistant Secretary of Defense, Mobilization and Director, Defense Mobilization Systems Planning Activity. He graduated from the United States Military Academy in 1950 with a B.S. degree in military science. He later earned an M.S. degree in civil engineering from Harvard University in 1955.

His military honors include the Distinguished Service Medal and three awards of the Legion of Merit.

References

1926 births
Living people
People from Boston
United States Military Academy alumni
United States Army personnel of the Korean War
Harvard University alumni
American civil engineers
United States Army personnel of the Vietnam War
Recipients of the Air Medal
Recipients of the Legion of Merit
United States Army generals
Recipients of the Distinguished Service Medal (US Army)
Military personnel from Massachusetts